We Didn't Learn This is a 1975 Soviet drama film directed by Ilya Frez.

Plot 
The film tells about the students of a pedagogical university who go to practice, where they pass difficult exams every day, both in front of teachers and schoolchildren.

Cast 
 Natalya Rychagova as Lena Yakusheva (as N. Rygachova)
 Boris Tokarev as Yuray Ryabinin (as B. Tokarev)
 Tatyana Kanaeva as Mila Khodzitskaya (as T. Kanaeva)
 Andrey Rostotskiy as Mitya Krasikov (as A. Rostotskiy)
 Irina Kalinovskaya as Ira (as A.Kalinovskaya)
 Antonina Maksimova as Galina Petrovna (as A. Maksimova)
 Tatyana Pelttser as Nadezhda Aleksandrovna (as T. Pelttser)
 Nina Zotkina as Valya Kuleshova (as N. Zotkina)
 Roman Tkachuk as Aleksandr Pavlovich Krasikov
 Natalya Zashchipina as Nina Krasikova

References

External links 
 

1975 films
1970s Russian-language films
Soviet drama films
1975 drama films
Soviet teen films